The Crime Control Act of 1990 was a large Act of Congress that had a considerable impact on the juvenile crime control policies of the 1990s. The bill was passed by the Congress on October 27, 1990, and signed into law by President George H. W. Bush on November 29, 1990.

The Bush administration requested a comprehensive crime bill that would expand the death penalty for federal crimes, reform habeas corpus, limit plea bargaining, revise exclusionary rule, and strengthen penalties for the use of firearms in the commission of a crime. Not all of the sought-after provisions were enacted, but the act made major changes in the areas of child abuse, sexual abuse penalties, victims' rights, and the enforcement of drug laws. The enacted titles were these:

 Anabolic Steroids Control Act of 1990
 Child Protection Restoration and Penalties Enhancement Act of 1990
 Comprehensive Thrift and Bank Fraud Prosecution and Taxpayer Recovery Act of 1990
 Criminal Victims Protection Act of 1990
 Federal Debt Collection Procedures Act of 1990
 Financial Institutions Anti-Fraud Enforcement Act of 1990
 Gun-Free School Zones Act of 1990
 Mandatory Detention for Offenders Convicted of Serious Crimes Act
 National Child Search Assistance Act of 1990
 National Law Enforcement Cooperation Act of 1990
 Victims of Child Abuse Act of 1990
 Victims' Rights and Restitution Act of 1990

See also
 National Commission on Financial Institution Reform, Recovery and Enforcement

References

Further reading

1990 in law
United States statutes that abrogate Supreme Court decisions